Abominationz is the ninth studio album by American hip-hop duo Twiztid. Released October 22, 2012, it was their last release under Psychopathic Records, as they left the label following its release.

Abominationz was predominantly produced by Strange Music in-house producer Seven. Featured guests on the album include Royce da 5'9" and Insane Clown Posse. A variation edition of the album featured additional guest appearances by Krizz Kaliko and Glasses Malone.

Background 

On August 16, 2011, Monoxide stated on Twitter that the next Twiztid album would feature a guest appearance from Hopsin. However, this ultimately did not happen.

On April 18, 2012, both Jamie Madrox and Monoxide were interviewed on Strange Music's BlogTalkRadio. During the interview, they released the new album title, Abominationz.

Recording for the album started in the first week of February 2012 and ended in late March 2012 as Twiztid prepared for their Kaos and Kronik tour. While Twiztid was on tour Joe Strange began mixing songs and recording of the album resumed in June 2012 after Twiztid had returned from tour.  The Album was finished being recorded and mixed between June 2012 and September 2012.

Music and lyrics 

Producer Seven provided a more varied sound for Twiztid on Abominationz, culling from blues on "Bad Side", providing a power ballad sound for "LDLHA-IBCSYWA" and generally drawing from electro and rap rock throughout the album, as well as underlining the raps and music with horror film-inspired sound design. For the album, Twiztid adopted a faster rapping style which allowed the duo to write more lyrics for the album than previous efforts. The duo's primary lyrical inspiration for the album was anger and hate, with elements of dark humor, including gallows humor.

Release 

The pamphlet included with Insane Clown Posse's album The Mighty Death Pop! announced that Twiztid's Abominationz would be released on October 23, 2012. The release date was later pushed up to October 22. On October 4, the track listing for Abominationz was released. On October 9, the single and a series of samples from the album were released.

Abominationz was released in alternate variant editions, each containing unique outer artwork depicting photographs of Jamie Madrox and Monoxide and a bonus track. The Madrox edition contained the bonus track "Return of the Pervert", and the Monoxide edition contained the bonus track "Sux 2 B U", which featured guest vocals by Krizz Kaliko and Glasses Malone. These variant editions were made available to purchase separately, or as a combo. The combined order was shipped with a poster. Those that purchased both Abominationz and Cold 187um's The Only Solution within two weeks of the album's release date also received a bonus CD containing Psychopathic Records' "Psyphers". In a December 4, 2014 interview, Twiztid stated that they will be re-releasing the album as well as W.I.C.K.E.D.

Reception 

Abominationz debuted at number 18 on the Billboard 200 chart and number 4 on the Top Independent Albums and number 2 on the Top Rap Albums charts and number 6 on the Top Tastemaker Albums. As of December the album has sold 29 000 copies.

Reviewing the album for Allmusic, David Jeffries gave the album 3.5 stars out of 5, writing, "As far as Twiztid as rappers, here they're as shameless and gross [...] as ever, although the tempo of their delivery has steadily increased, making the Abominationz lyric sheet longer than previous albums. [...] Abominationz finds Twiztid delivering the hyped-up, hate-filled, horror-rap goods with plenty of punch and the grimmest of jokes."

Track listing

Personnel 

Band members and production
Jamie Madrox  –  vocals
Monoxide  – vocals, producer
Michael "Seven" Summers  – producer
Joe Strange  – engineer, mix engineer, additional guitars, drums, producer
Kullen Cruickshank  – assistant engineer
Jeff Rebrovich   - keyboards

Other personnel
Violent J – guest vocals
Blaze Ya Dead Homie  – additional vocals on "Lift Me Up"
Leah Stalker  – vocals
George Vlahakis  – vocals
Royce Da 5'9"  – guest vocals
Shaggy 2 Dope – guest vocals, additional vocals on "2nd 2no 1"
E-Wolf  – photography
Jim Nerve  – artwork

References 

2012 albums
Albums produced by Seven (record producer)
Twiztid albums
Psychopathic Records albums